Benjamin Heinz-Dieter Buchloh (born November 15, 1941) is a German art historian.  Between 2005 and 2021 he was the Andrew W. Mellon Professor of Modern Art in the History of Art and Architecture department at Harvard University.

Education and career
Born in Cologne, Germany on November 15, 1941, Buchloh received a M.Phil in German literature from the Freie Universität Berlin in 1969.  He later obtained his Ph.D in art history in 1994 from the Graduate Center at the City University of New York, where he studied with fellow art historian Rosalind Krauss.

After time as an editor for German art journal Interfunktionen and teaching stints at the Kunstakademie Düsseldorf, NSCAD University, and CalArts, Buchloh began teaching art history at the State University of New York at Old Westbury and the University of Chicago.  He later taught at the Massachusetts Institute of Technology as an associate professor from 1989–1994. From 1991–1993, he also served as the Director of Critical and Curatorial Studies for the Whitney Museum of American Art Independent Study Program. He then taught at both Columbia University and its sister college, Barnard College, as Virginia B. Wright Professor of Twentieth-Century and Contemporary Art from 1994–2005, including service as a department chair from 1997–2000.

In 2005, he joined the Harvard University department of History of Art and Architecture. He was named Franklin D. and Florence Rosenblatt Professor of Modern Art.  In 2006, he was named Andrew W. Mellon Professor of Modern Art. In 2007, Buchloh won the Golden Lion award at the 2007 Venice Biennale for his work as an art historian towards contributing to contemporary art. In fall 2009, Benjamin Buchloh resided at the American Academy in Berlin as a Daimler Fellow. In 2021 he retired from teaching.

Buchloh is currently a co-editor of the art journal October and in 2022 completed a monograph of Gerhard Richter titled Gerhard Richter: Painting After the Subject of History.

Works
His book, Neo-Avantgarde and Culture Industry (2000), is a collection of eighteen essays on major figures of postwar art written since the late 1970s. It covers Nouveau Réalisme in France (Arman, Yves Klein, Jacques de la Villeglé), postwar German art (Joseph Beuys, Sigmar Polke, Gerhard Richter), American Fluxus and Pop Art (Robert Watts and Andy Warhol), minimalism and postminimal art (Michael Asher and Richard Serra), and European and American conceptual art (Daniel Buren, Dan Graham). Buchloh addresses some artists in terms of their oppositional approaches to language and painting, for example, Nancy Spero and Lawrence Weiner. About others, he asks more general questions concerning the development of models of institutional critique (Hans Haacke) and the theorization of the museum (Marcel Broodthaers); and addresses the formation of historical memory in postconceptual art (James Coleman).

The second volume of Buchloh's collected essays Formalism and Historicity: Models and Methods in Twentieth-Century Art was released in February 2015. It collects a series of important and widely influential essays on thematic and historical issues in twentieth-century art including the "return to order," Soviet "factography," and the "paradigm repetitions" of the neo-avant-garde.

Bibliography

Andy Warhol: A Retrospective, with Kynaston McShine and Robert Rosenblum, 1990, 
Gerhard Richter: Documenta IX 1992, 1993, 
Gerhard Richter, with José Lebrero, 1994, 
James Coleman: Projected Images 1972-1994, with Lynne Cooke, 1995, 
Experiments in the Everyday: Allan Kaprow and Robert Watts--Events, Objects, Documents, with Judith Rodenbeck, 2000, 
Thomas Struth: Portraits, with Thomas Weski, 2001, 
Gerhard Richter: Acht Grau, 2002, 
Allan Sekula: Performance Under Working Conditions, with Karner Dietrich, 2003, 
Neo-Avantgarde and Culture Industry: Essays on European and American Art from 1955 to 1975, 2003, 
Art Since 1900 with Hal Foster, Rosalind Krauss, and Yve-Alain Bois, 2004, 
Thomas Hirschhorn, 2004, 
Flashback: Revisiting The Art of the Eighties, with John Armleder, 2006, 
Hans Haacke: For Real, with Rosalyn Deutsche, 2007, 
Andy Warhol: Shadows and Other Signs of Life, 2008, 
Ground Zero, with David Brussel and Isa Genzken, 2008, 
Nancy Spero, with Mignon Nixon and Hélène Cixous, 2008, 
Bauhaus 1919-1933, with Barry Bergdoll, Leah Dickerman, and Brigid Doherty, 2009, 
Gerhard Richter: Large Abstracts, 2009, 
Art Since 1900: 1900 to 1944, with Hal Foster, Yve-Alain Bois, and Rosalind Krauss, 2011, 
Gerhard Richter: 18 Oktober 1977, 2011, 
Formalism and Historicity: Models and Methods in Twentieth-Century Art, 2015, 
Sarah Sze, with Okwui Enwezor and Laura Hoptman, Phaidon Press, 2016. 
Conceptual Art 1962-1969: From Aesthetic of Administration to the Critique of Institutions, 1990.

References

External links
American Academy in Berlin profile

1941 births
Living people
Writers from Cologne
German art historians
Academic staff of Kunstakademie Düsseldorf
Academic staff of NSCAD University
California Institute of the Arts faculty
State University of New York at Old Westbury faculty
University of Chicago faculty
Massachusetts Institute of Technology faculty
Columbia University faculty
Barnard College faculty
Harvard University faculty
German male non-fiction writers